Andersen Global is an association of legally separate, independent member firms providing services under the brand Andersen, Andersen Tax, Andersen Tax & Legal or Andersen Legal. The association reports to having more than 7000 professionals, more than 1000 global partners, and a presence in more than 263 locations worldwide through its member firms and collaborating firms. The member firms and collaborating firms of Andersen Global provide services to global clients in all facets of their tax and legal affairs.

Through its member firms, Andersen Global has a presence in North America, Latin America, Africa, Europe, and the Middle East.

History 
In July 2013, WTAS Global was founded by U.S. member firm WTAS LLC, a wealth and tax advisory firm that had been founded in 2002 by 23 former Arthur Andersen partners. In 2014, WTAS LLC changed its name to Andersen Tax, and WTAS Global changed its name to Andersen Global.

In July 2017, Andersen Global announced its global Board of Directors led by Andersen Global Chairman Mark Vorsatz.

In September 2018, Andersen Global announced the existence of its European Regional Board of Directors, which is led by co-Managing Directors Andrea De Vecchi and Paolo Mondia. The board is composed of tax and legal partners from Andersen Global member firms in the EU.

In 2018, Andersen Global announced several locations adopting the Andersen name, such as in Canada and Uruguay.

By the Fall of 2018, Andersen Global had grown to a headcount of more than 3,500 professionals in more than 111 locations across the globe.

As of early 2019, Andersen Global reported locations in 48 countries, with legal capabilities in 39. Vorsatz stated the firm is focused on rapid growth and expects to have locations in 100 countries in three years. Vorsatz plans to add 20 law firms to Andersen Global in 2019. In Fall 2019, Andersen Tax changed its brand name to Andersen.

References 

Financial services companies established in 2013
Multinational companies